The discography of A-ha, a Norwegian synthpop/rock band, consists of eleven studio albums, eight compilation albums, six box sets, ten extended plays, and fifty singles. This list does not include solo material or other projects recorded by A-ha band members.

A-ha was formed in 1982 by vocalist Morten Harket, guitarist Paul Waaktaar-Savoy, and keyboardist Magne Furuholmen. The band moved to London and eventually signed with Warner Bros. Records. They released their debut album Hunting High and Low in 1985, which remains their biggest success and contained their international break-through hit song "Take On Me". The band has scored two top twenty US hits in their career, but has had several hit singles in many countries in Europe, South America and their native Norway. By 1993, the band had released five studio albums before going on hiatus the following year.

After a performance at the Nobel Peace Prize Concert in 1998, the band returned to the studio and recorded a new album, Minor Earth Major Sky, which was released in 2000. Their next album, Lifelines, was released in 2002, but would be their final album for Warner Bros. After signing to Polydor (part of Universal Music), further new albums were released in 2005 and 2009, after which the band decided to break up. However, they reformed for yet another new album, Cast in Steel, which was released in 2015. In 2022 they signed a one album deal with RCA/Sony Music and released the True North album in 2022. Harket, Furuholmen and Waaktaar-Savoy have been awarded Spellemannprisen 8 times. Through 2009 A-ha had sold over 100 million records worldwide. The band has released eleven studio albums, five compilations and four live albums.

In their native Norway, eight of the band's studio albums and eight of their singles have reached number one.

Albums

Studio albums

Live albums

Compilation albums

Box sets

Reissues

EPs

Singles

Promotional singles

Videos

Video albums

"—" denotes releases that did not chart or were not released in that territory.

Music videos

Audiobooks

Other appearances

Selected major television appearances

Notes

References

External links

Discographies of Norwegian artists
Discography
Pop music group discographies
New wave discographies